Nationen (Swedish: The Nation) was a weekly fascist newspaper which was in circulation in the period 1925–1941. During its lifetime the paper was the most popular and most read anti-semitic publication in Sweden.

History and profile
Nationen was established by Elof Eriksson, one of the fascist politicians in Sweden, in 1925. In the first issue Eriksson declared the goal of the paper as to protect Swedish culture and its values against the threats of the modern developments and modernity. The paper also supported the idea that Sweden should be freed from the yoke of Jewish cosmopolitanism. The readers of Nationen were predominantly middle-class Swede men and also those living abroad. The paper was first close to Fascist People's Party of Sweden and then, to Frihetsrörelsen which was founded in 1937.

Most of the articles published in Nationen were written by Elof Eriksson. However, there were other contributors, including Hans Günther, a German expat, and  Herman Lundborg, a Swede eugenicist. An anti-semitic document entitled The Protocols of the Elders of Zion was published several times in Nationen which was circulated in public until 1935 when its public distribution was banned due to its harsh criticisms over freemasonry. Then the paper was sold through subscription and distributed via Nazi parties in the country. At the end of the 1930s the paper enjoyed highest circulation levels selling nearly 30,000 copies. Eriksson attempted to publish the paper on a daily basis, but managed to publish it as a weekly publication. In its last three years Nationen became a bi-monthly periodical and folded in 1941.

References

1925 establishments in Sweden
1941 disestablishments in Sweden
Antisemitic publications
Bi-monthly magazines published in Sweden
Defunct newspapers published in Sweden
Defunct magazines published in Sweden
Defunct political magazines
Defunct weekly newspapers
Fascist newspapers and magazines
Magazines published in Stockholm
Newspapers published in Stockholm
Political magazines published in Sweden
Publications established in 1925
Magazines disestablished in 1941
Swedish-language magazines
Swedish-language newspapers
Swedish nationalism
Weekly newspapers published in Sweden
Magazines established in 1938